Lazarice, also known by its Bulgarian name Lazaruvane, is a South Slavic traditional procession during the Eastern Orthodox feast of Lazareva Subota (corresponding to, but distinct from Lazarus Saturday in other Orthodox churches), the day before Palm Sunday. The historians and anthropologists think that Lazarice originated from the Roman  festival Rosalia , popularized in Southeastern Europe by the Romans after their conquest of Balkans in the II century B.C. Slavic tribes, settled in the Balkans in VI - VII century was adopted and developed part of the Greek - Roman traditions in their rites. 

Traditionally, a girl who has never participated in the ritual may not marry or be engaged.

The ritual is performed by young girls (typically of age 16 who are unmarried), called lazarki. The girls decorate their hair richly and colourfully (usually with flower and ribbon wreaths) and dance around the village singing songs. They stop from house to house, performing songs and blessing the homes, accepting small presents and food from the hosts, typically the men. They meet by a river, where they drop their wreaths. It is said that the girl whose laurel first takes the lead will be married first.

Traditionally the groups of lazarki would number around 14, but there are regional variances. It is no longer widely practiced in the large cities where many people live, and tends to be kept alive in the smaller villages - at least those which have young girls.

References 

 Ђорђевић Д. Живот и обичаjи народни у Лесковачкоj Морави. — Београд, 1958.
 Каменова А. Пролетни обичаи от Чипровци // Българска етнография. Българска етнология. — София, 1992. — No. 4. — С. 40–46.
 Маринов Д. Народна вяра и религиозни народни обичаи. — София, 1914.

External links 
 Shopski Lazarki
 Song "Oy Lazare, Lazare"
 Song "Vilay Moma Lazare"
 How Bulgarians Celebrate Lazarus Saturday - EU Scoop

Bulgarian traditions
Serbian traditions